Fox's Confectionery is an English confectionery company based in Braunstone, Leicester which was founded in 1880.

History
The company was set up by Walter Richard Fox as a wholesale grocery and confectionery business in 1880. It started in a Victorian warehouse in Leicester. By 1897 Fox was manufacturing over 100 different confectionery lines.

In 1969, the company was acquired by Mackintosh's, a year prior to the creation of Rowntree Mackintosh when Mackintosh merged with Rowntree's of York. After purchasing Rowntree-Macintosh in 1988, Nestlé sold the Fox's Brand and its Leicester site to Northern Foods in 2001. The company was sold to Big Bear Ltd in 2003. Big Bear Confectionery had sites in Blackburn, Leicester and Nimbus.

Peppy (from peppermint) the polar bear is the original trademark used for Fox's Glacier Mints and was created by Leicester-based artist C. Reginald Dalby, better known for illustrating The Railway Series books by the Rev. W. Awdry.

Fox's Confectionery was acquired by Valeo Foods in 2015.

In Indonesia, Fox's candies are currently manufactured by PT Savoria Kreasi Rasa (a subsidiary of Djarum, a cigarette manufacturing company).

Products 
 Fox's "Glacier" Range
 Fox's Glacier Mints
 Fox's Glacier Fruits
 Fox's Glacier Dark
Paynes Poppets
 XXX Mints
 Just Mints
 Just Brazils
 Milk Chocolate Just Brazils
 Dark Chocolate Just Brazils
 Le Bar (discontinued ~1994)

References

External links
Company website
XXX Mints

Guardian article: Callow returns as Fox's polar bear
Guardian article: Fox's biscuits launches 'danda' ad (mentions image rights vs Fox Polar Bear)

Nestlé brands
British companies established in 1880
Confectionery companies of the United Kingdom
1880 establishments in England
Food and drink companies established in 1880